John Kelly (1913 – after 1936) was an English professional footballer who played as a centre forward or inside forward.

Career
Kelly was born in 1913 in Sandbach, Cheshire. He was on the books of Accrington Stanley before making his Football League debut for Leeds United during the 1934–35 season. He was known as Mick Kelly while at Leeds, to distinguish him from clubmate Jack Kelly. He left Leeds on 23 October 1935, and after a brief spell with Barnsley, during which he played three Second Division matches, he signed for Bradford City on 21 November, which meant he was registered with three clubs within a month. During his time with Bradford City he made five appearances in the Football League, and left in 1936 for Bedford Town.

His brother Dom also played league football.

Sources

References

1913 births
Year of death missing
People from Sandbach
English footballers
Association football forwards
Accrington Stanley F.C. (1891) players
Leeds United F.C. players
Barnsley F.C. players
Bradford City A.F.C. players
Bedford Town F.C. players
English Football League players
British Army personnel of World War II
Irish Guards soldiers